Paul Stender AKA "Jet Car Paul" is best known for designing, building, and driving some of the most extreme and fastest Jet/Turbine Engine powered land vehicles in the world.

Early life and education
Stender was born in Big Bend, Wisconsin, and attended Mukwonago High School. Stender's parents were John (1930-2001) and Patrica (1932-1992). His father served in the US Navy, ran a large Dairy Farm in Big Bend, and when the Milwaukee suburbs moved in closer, became a Realtor. His mother raised Paul on the farm and their new house until he became old enough to take care of himself then went on to a very successful career at Marshall Fields in Wauwatosa, Wisconsin.

Racing career

Beginnings
Stender grew up racing ATVs, motorcycles, and snowmobiles in his teens and early twenties. He then made the jump into the big leagues and began racing Badger and USAC Midgets. He continued his racing career as an Outlaw Sprint Car Driver at race tracks across the country. After a series of spectacular crashes that resulted in numerous broken bones and concussions, he retired from Oval Racing in the early 1990s.

He continued to build his Polaris Powersports Dealership into one of the top 10 volume dealers in the world gaining him the nickname "Polaris Paul". In 1994 along with help from the staff from his dealership along with the Muskego Icetronauts Snowmobile Club, Stender broke the endurance record for snowmobiles by completing 1740 miles on a Ski-Doo MX-Z 440 Snowmobile in 24 hours on Big Muskego Lake, Muskego, Wisconsin enduring wind chill temperatures in excess of -80 degree F at 100 MPH.

Jet Motorsports Exhibition
A year later he was drag racing a snowmobile on asphalt at Great Lakes Dragaway in Union Grove, Wisconsin when he watched a jet funny car and a dragster race. He decided that Jet Car Exhibition was going to be the next step in his Motorsports career. After searching for some time, he decided to purchase one of the fastest in the country, the Jazz Jet Funny Car which he renamed "Runnin' with the Devil". It was capable of speeds in excess of 300 mph. In his first full year of racing, he was awarded the Pro-Jet Rookie of the Year Award. 

The newly built Dodge Ramjet was the next Jet Vehicle in the now named "Speed For Hire" stable of Jets. To prove the 12,000 HP Dodge Truck was the fastest in the world, Stender ran a 397 MPH pass at an airshow in Texas on a three-mile-long runway, setting the record for "World's Fastest Jet Pickup".

Monsters
In the late '90s Stender decided to dedicate all his time and effort to his Motorsports business. He acquired the world's only car crushing Monster Harley-Davidson Motorcycle to perform at events nationwide. It was also put on display during Harley-Davidson's 100th year anniversary. The monsters weren't going to stop there. Stender went to a Monster Truck show in Michigan to watch his new Jet ATV perform. He met Kirk Dabney of Xtreme Overkill Monster Truck fame. Kirk was looking to sell his truck and he jumped at the chance. Stender then ran a few months with the Overkill body until Clear Channel Motorsports, now named Feld Motorsports approached him and wanted him to run the "Bulldozer" body on his truck. The Bulldozer Monster Truck was one of the premier Monster Trucks in the Monster Jam and Thunder Nationals series. Stender ran the entire series until a late-season crash caused him to shatter his L-1 Vertebrae. The Bulldozer contract was completed and he decided to mount a new Dodge body on the truck and name it "American Cowboy" With its American theme and two American flags on the rear, the truck was a hit everywhere it performed.

More Jets 
After a few years with the monsters, Stender decided to sell them and concentrate on the jet/turbine end of the business. He was campaigning the Ramjet and Runnin' with the Devil for a few years along with the newest members to the family of jets, the Kamikaze and Green Monster Jet ATVs. Stender wanted something new and like nothing else ever, a Jet Outhouse. One day while at an airshow in the deep southwest he saw the wind blow a portable outhouse across the tarmac at high speed. After seeing that he came up with the idea of a jet-powered outhouse. One week later a  Jet Outhouse was racing around Big Bend, Wisconsin.

After the Jet Outhouse was built Stender decided to move his entire motorsports operation to Indianapolis, Indiana, the Racing Capital of the World. There he was surrounded by race teams and racing businesses which made building any race vehicles easier. 

The jets didn't stop there. He even gained the nickname "Jet Car Paul".

The hit show Monster Garage on the Discovery Channel was looking for something new. Stender always wanted to build a Jet Beer Truck being that he was from Milwaukee, Wisconsin. They agreed and away they went. He found the largest allowed jet engine in the NHRA rulebook, a General Electric J-79 out of an F-4 Fighter Jet. It was 20 feet long, had 21,000 pounds of thrust and 42,000 horsepower. The Monster Garage crew flew up to Paul's shop in Indianapolis and after a week of filming, they completed the J-79 powered Jet Beer Truck. 

Paul kept building and the next one on tap was a Jet School Bus. It would be 30 feet long, have the same GE J-79 jet engine. This bus was unique being it had three passenger seats in it to give rides to media members along with others. The Jet Bus was timed at an event in Texas where it ran 367 MPH, A world record for a School Bus. It has been a media darling ever since being featured on numerous television shows and online websites.

Another strange jet that Stender built was the Jet Doghouse. After doing a speech at a school he asked what the kids would like to see him build next. After a lot of replays such as a jet wagon, a jet Go-Ped, and others someone said jet doghouse. That one stuck with Stender throughout the Airshow weekend where he was performing and the ride home. After getting back to the shop a Jet-Powered Doghouse emerged a week later.

There was always something new and exciting going on at Stender's shop. He has given numerous tours to car clubs, schools, and even just interested persons that may have seen us online. Stender always had a jet vehicle or a jet engine out front which people driving by couldn't resist asking about.

Stender has performed at air shows and motorsport events around the world including in Trinidad, Puerto Rico, and even in Abu Dhabi in the UAE.

There are even some street-legal Turbine-powered vehicles including a 928 Porche, a Chevrolet Pickup Truck, and a 23' Ford T-Bucket. One interesting street-legal jet was the Urban Legend '67 Chevrolet Impala which had a Jet Engine mounted on the roof. This was based on one of the Internets biggest Urban Legends, the '67 Impala that someone bolted a JATO (Jet Assisted Take Off Rocket) Rocket onto which he lit and uncontrollably drove into the side of a mountain in Arizona, destroying the car and killing him. Supposedly the were skid marks over a mile long where he tried to apply the brakes. Only small bits of the car and driver were recovered.

Media
Stender and his vehicles have been featured in publications including FHM, Popular Science, ESPN the Magazine, Ripley’s Believe It or Not, and the National Enquirer. He has also been featured on television channels that include: CBS, NBC, Country Music Channel, Monster Garage (Discovery Channel), Fox News Channel, and Horsepower TV in the United States. Paul and his jet vehicles have appeared on numerous Japanese and other foreign television shows.

Currently
Paul is writing an autobiography on his life named: Jet Car Paul, Life at 300 MPH. He hopes to have it on bookshelves in 2022. He also has a few more jet vehicles on the drawing board that he plans to build in the future.

References

External links
Jet Car Paul, WTHR

People from Big Bend, Waukesha County, Wisconsin
Living people
1965 births